Lloreda is a surname. Notable people with this surname include:

 Álvaro Lloreda Caicedo (1903—1985), Colombian industrialist, newspaper publisher, and politician
 Francisco José Lloreda Mera (born 1965), Colombian lawyer, politician, writer, editor and newspaper director
 Laura Daniela Lloreda (born 1991), Puerto Rican-born naturalized Mexican citizen and volleyball player 
 Rodrigo Hernán Lloreda Caicedo (1942—2000), Colombian lawyer and politician 

Spanish-language surnames